Jonesport-Beals High School is a public high school in Jonesport, Maine in eastern Washington County in the United States. Students who attend the high school come from both Jonesport and Beals, Maine. The high school has approximately 100 enrolled students from grades 9-12 and is part of the Union #103 & Moosabec Community School District.

References

External links
 Union #103 & Moosabec Community School District

Public high schools in Maine
Schools in Washington County, Maine
Jonesport, Maine